Argyle is a village in Lafayette County, Wisconsin, United States. The population was 857 at the 2010 census, up from 823 at the 2000 census. The village is located within the Town of Argyle.

History
The village began at a convenient ford for crossing the East Branch Pecatonica River. The first settler named it after the Duke of Argyll who had sponsored his coming to the United States. That came after an application for a post office under the name of Hazel Green was denied on the grounds that there already was a Hazel Green in Wisconsin. The village's original settlers were dominantly from New England, Norway and Ireland, which is reflected in the village's three oldest churches, Argyle Methodist Church (UMC), Argyle Lutheran Church (ELCA), and St. Joseph's Catholic Church.

Geography
Argyle is located at  (42.701827, -89.866408).

The East Branch Pecatonica River flows through this area.

Demographics

2010 census
As of the census of 2010, there were 857 people, 366 households, and 223 families residing in the village. The racial makeup of the village was 99.1% White, 0.1% African American, 0.4% Native American, 0.1% from other races, and 0.4% from two or more races. Hispanic or Latino of any race were 2.0% of the population.

There were 366 households, of which 31.7% had children under the age of 18 living with them, 46.2% were married couples living together, 9.0% had a female householder with no husband present, 5.7% had a male householder with no wife present, and 39.1% were non-families. 33.3% of all households were made up of individuals, and 15.1% had someone living alone who was 65 years of age or older. The average household size was 2.34 and the average family size was 3.00.

The median age in the village was 39.6 years. 24.9% of residents were under the age of 18; 8.9% were between the ages of 18 and 24; 23.6% were from 25 to 44; 25.5% were from 45 to 64; and 17.3% were 65 years of age or older. The gender makeup of the village was 51.8% male and 48.2% female.

2000 census
As of the census of 2000, there were 823 people, 343 households, and 214 families residing in the village. The population density was 1,361.0 people per square mile (529.6/km2). There were 365 housing units at an average density of 603.6 per square mile (234.9/km2). The racial makeup of the village was 99.88% White and 0.12% Black or African American. 0.73% of the population were Hispanic or Latino of any race.

There were 343 households, out of which 30.0% had children under the age of 18 living with them, 49.0% were married couples living together, 9.3% had a female householder with no husband present, and 37.6% were non-families. 31.2% of all households were made up of individuals, and 16.9% had someone living alone who was 65 years of age or older. The average household size was 2.40 and the average family size was 3.01.

In the village, the population was spread out, with 25.8% under the age of 18, 6.2% from 18 to 24, 28.7% from 25 to 44, 19.7% from 45 to 64, and 19.7% who were 65 years of age or older. The median age was 39 years. For every 100 females, there were 103.2 males. For every 100 females age 18 and over, there were 99.0 males.

The median income for a household in the village was $36,103, and the median income for a family was $44,063. Males had a median income of $28,029 versus $22,434 for females. The per capita income for the village was $15,974. About 6.7% of families and 8.7% of the population were below the poverty line, including 9.5% of those under age 18 and 10.1% of those age 65 or over.

Education
The elementary school, middle school, and high school in Argyle are in one building located in the northwest part of the village. Enrollment in the elementary school is about 120 students, with about 180 students in the middle and high school.

Historic landmarks

The Star Theatre in Argyle is on the National Register of Historic Places.

Notable people
Byron Andrews (1852-1910), journalist for Chicago Inter-Ocean newspaper, part owner of National Tribune Publishing Co. in Washington, D.C., Private corresponding secretary to U.S. Pres. Ulysses S. Grant during Industrial Excursions to Mexico and Cuba
Robert La Follette, Sr. (1855-1925), 20th Governor of Wisconsin, United States Senator, and candidate for President of the United States (Progressive Party) lived in Argyle.
James U. Goodman (1872-1953), Wisconsin State Representative, lived in Argyle.
Martin O. Monson (1885-1969), Wisconsin State Representative, was born in Argyle.
S. Dell Penniston 1870-1961), Wisconsin State Representative, was born in Argyle.

References

External links

 Village of Argyle, Wisconsin website
 Historic Argyle website
 Argyle Public Library website
 Sanborn fire insurance maps: 1894 1900 1908 1915

Villages in Lafayette County, Wisconsin
Villages in Wisconsin